The free routine combination synchronised swimming competition at the 2009 World Aquatics Championships was held in Rome, Italy from July 17 to August 2, 2009. The competition was won by Spain, who performed a routine to the Led Zeppelin song "Stairway to Heaven". The gold medal was the first world championship title in the history of the Spanish synchronised swimming team.

Medalist

Results

Green denotes finalists

References

External links
Preliminary Results

Synchronised swimming at the 2009 World Aquatics Championships